Suillus neoalbidipes is a species of edible mushroom in the genus Suillus. It was described as a new species by Mary Palm and Elwin Stewart in 1984.

See also
List of North American boletes

References

External links

neoalbidipes
Edible fungi
Fungi of North America
Fungi described in 1984